The Ramparts of Montreal were the fortification walls built to protect the early settlement of Montreal, the area now called Old Montreal.

Construction

Building began in 1716 by Gaspard Chaussegros de Léry bounded roughly by rue McGill in the west, rues St. Jacques/Champ des Mars/Notre-Dame in the north, rue Berri in the east, rue de la Commune/Place d'Youville in the south and completed in 1738. The wall replaced cedar post palisades built in the 17th century and required expropriation of land from property owners who were later offered an opportunity to reclaim during demolition.

Gates
There were eight entrances along the walls:

 Porte des Récollets
 Porte de Saint-Laurent
 Porte de Québec
 Porte de la Canoterie
 Porte du Gouvernement
 Porte de l'Hôtel-Dieu
 Porte du Marché
 Porte de la Petite rivière

Visual documents of the wall are limited but given it was designed by de Léry who built a wall in Quebec it can be assumed it would look very similar.

Decline and demolition
Despite the 6 metres the wall failed to repel the British (and only effective against attacks from the First Nations) and city fell in 1760 and by Americans in 1775. The British administration passed an Act (The Act to Demolish the Old Walls and Fortifications Surrounding the City of Montréal 1801) to begin the process to demolish the fortifications and provided landowners to reclaim lost land back. From 1804 to 1817 the walls were torn down and allowed the city to expand and grow.

Remains of the wall foundation have resurfaced and have been documented:

 Parc du Champ-de-Mars
 at Pointe-à-Callière, Montréal Museum of Archaeology and History
 Les Remparts Restaurant on rue de la Commune

Fortification Lane is also reminder of the existence of the walls.

The city has tried to include outlines to highlight where the walls once stood.

References

Montreal
Fortifications articles needing attention
18th century in Montreal